Lobocleta ossularia, the drab brown wave moth, is a moth in the family Geometridae. It is found in North America, where it has been recorded from California to Florida, north in the east to New York and Illinois.

The wingspan is 13–19 mm. The forewings are greyish-brown with black speckling and four dark brown lines. The hindwings are similar in both colour and pattern. Adults are on wing from June to September in California.

The larvae feed on Stellaria media, Galium species and Fragaria chiloensis.

References

Moths described in 1837
Sterrhini